Jasvir Rakkar (born April 27, 1991) is a Canadian professional baseball pitcher who is a free agent.

Career
Rakkar's parents were born in Punjab, India, and immigrated to Canada before Jasvir was born. Rakkar graduated from Bramalea Secondary School in Brampton, Ontario, and enrolled at Stony Brook University to play college baseball for the Stony Brook Seawolves. The Chicago Cubs selected Rakkar in the 26th round of the 2012 Major League Baseball draft.

Rakkar signed with the Québec Capitales of the independent Canadian American Association of Professional Baseball in 2016.

International career
He was selected to the Canada national baseball team at the 2015 Pan American Games, 2015 WBSC Premier12, 2019 Pan American Games Qualifier, 2019 Pan American Games and 2019 WBSC Premier12.

References

External links

1991 births
Living people
Arizona League Cubs players
Baseball pitchers
Baseball players at the 2015 Pan American Games
Baseball players at the 2019 Pan American Games
Boise Hawks players
Canada national baseball team players
Canadian expatriate baseball players in the United States
Canadian people of Indian descent
Daytona Cubs players
Iowa Cubs players
Kane County Cougars players
Myrtle Beach Pelicans players
Pan American Games gold medalists for Canada
Pan American Games silver medalists for Canada
Pan American Games medalists in baseball
People from Brampton
Québec Capitales players
South Bend Cubs players
Stony Brook Seawolves baseball players
Medalists at the 2015 Pan American Games
Medalists at the 2019 Pan American Games